Gordon Elsworth Smith (November 5, 1918 – June 9, 2005) was a politician in Ontario, Canada. He was a Progressive Conservative member of the Legislative Assembly of Ontario from 1967 to 1981 who represented the central Ontario riding of Simcoe East.

Background
Smith was an active member of the Masonic Lodge from 1947, serving as District Deputy Grand Master, at Twin Lakes Lodge, Orillia, in 1966.

Politics
After winning the elections in 1967, 1971, 1975, and 1977, he served in the 28th, 29th, 30th and 31st Legislative Assemblies in Ontario. He retired from politics in 1981.

References

External links
 

1918 births
2005 deaths
People from Parry Sound District
Progressive Conservative Party of Ontario MPPs